USS Chimo may refer to the following ships of the United States Navy:

 , was a light-draft ironclad monitor.
 ,  was renamed Tadousac (AT-22) on 24 February 1919.
 , acquired by the U.S Navy on 7 April 1944.

United States Navy ship names